Aydınpınar is a village in the Düzce District of Düzce Province in Turkey. Its population is 2,712 (2022). The village has a primary- and a middle school.

The Aydınpınar National park with a waterfall is located near the village. A second waterfall was discovered in early 2021 and a walkpath to it was finished later that year.

References

Villages in Düzce District